Lize Kop (born  17 March 1998) is a Dutch professional footballer who plays as a goalkeeper for Eredivisie club Ajax and the Netherlands national team.

Career
Kop was selected for the 2019 FIFA Women's World Cup. She made her international debut in 2019 against Poland in the Algarve Cup.

Career statistics

International

References

External links
Senior national team profile at Onsoranje.nl (in Dutch)
Under-23 national team profile at Onsoranje.nl (in Dutch)
Under-20 national team profile at Onsoranje.nl (in Dutch)
Under-19 national team profile at Onsoranje.nl (in Dutch)
Under-17 national team profile at Onsoranje.nl (in Dutch)
Under-16 national team profile at Onsoranje.nl (in Dutch)

1998 births
Living people
People from Oldenzaal
Dutch women's footballers
AFC Ajax (women) players
Eredivisie (women) players
Netherlands women's international footballers
2019 FIFA Women's World Cup players
Women's association football goalkeepers
Footballers at the 2020 Summer Olympics
Olympic footballers of the Netherlands
Footballers from North Holland
Footballers from Overijssel